The 1836 United States presidential election in Georgia took place between November 3 and December 7, 1836, as part of the 1836 United States presidential election. Voters chose 11 representatives, or electors to the Electoral College, who voted for president and vice president.

Georgia voted for Whig candidate Hugh White over the Democratic candidate, Martin Van Buren. White won Georgia by a margin of 3.6%.

This was the only election in which a Democrat won the presidency without carrying Georgia until  1964, nearly 130 years later. Alongside Lyndon Johnson in that year, only Bill Clinton in 1996 (though he carried the state four years prior) and Barack Obama in 2008 and 2012 have been elected without carrying it.

Results

References

Georgia
1836
1836 Georgia (U.S. state) elections